Sandra Dorsey (born September 28, 1939) is an American film and television actress, she is also a theatre actress, director, writer and choreographer. She is best known for her role in the 1989 horror sequel Sleepaway Camp III: Teenage Wasteland.

Life and career
Dorsey was born in Atlanta, Georgia. Dorsey founded Dorsey Studios in 1977.  Before her acting career, Dorsey was a teacher of acting and singing exclusively in New York City. She has also taught at the Alliance Theatre in Atlanta and in Emory University. she is a member of the Screen Actors Guild, Actors' Equity Association, The American Federation of Television and Radio Arts, the Dekalb Council for the Arts, The College Music Society, the Episcopal Drama Foundation, and The National Academy of Television Arts and Sciences. She has also served as SAG president for the state of Georgia. In addition to her work at Dorsey studios, Dorsey has worked at the Bachelor of Arts, Oglethorpe University, Master of Fine Arts in Vocal Performance and the University of Georgia.  She has also attended the Academy of Vocal Arts in Philadelphia, and has studied extensively with the David LeGrant Actors Studio in New York. She has performed in five plays on Broadway in NYC, Illya Darling with Melina Mercouri, Gantry with Robert Shaw and Rita Moreno, Drat! The Cat! with Elliott Gould, On the Town with Bernadette Peters and Phyllis Newman, and Mata Hari with Pernell Roberts and directed by Vincente Minnelli. She played Franlein Kost in the National Tour of Cabaret directed by Harold Prince.  Dorsey wrote and directed Biba Revue at Maxim’s in Chicago, she directed and choreographed Amahl and the Night Visitors in Atlanta, and was musical director for An Evening with Rodgers and Hammerstein at Emory University. She also directed the critically acclaimed Jacques Brel Is Alive and Well and Living in Paris.

Dorsey began her acting career in 1976 when she appeared in the horror film Grizzly.  She then appeared in her second film They Went That-A-Way & That-A-Way in 1978 and the following year she starred alongside Sally Field and Beau Bridges in the classic film Norma Rae.  Dorsey's husband Joe Dorsey also made appearances in each of these films.  Dorsey is best known for her role in the horror movie Sleepaway Camp III: Teenage Wasteland, alongside Pamela Springsteen and Michael J. Pollard. In the film, she played the role of camp owner Lily Miranda. Her and her on-screen husband (Pollard) Herman's character names were after The Munsters characters Herman and Lily Munster, and the other characters in the film were named after The Brady Bunch. Her death scene, with her head being decapitated by a lawnmower, is perhaps the best death scene in the film. This was Dorsey's second time working with director Michael A. Simpson, as the first was in 1986 with Impure Thoughts. In 1995, Dorsey played the role of Maxine in the Disney movie Gordy, which was her final feature film to date.

Her television credits include The Dukes of Hazzard. She has also appeared in several television films including Passing Glory, with Rip Torn, Frankenstein, with Parker Posey, and Angel City, which again featured her husband, Joe working alongside her.

Filmography

References

External links
 Dorsey Studios official site
 
 

1939 births
Living people
Actresses from Atlanta
American film actresses
American television actresses
American theatre directors
Women theatre directors
21st-century American women